Baâlons is a commune in the Ardennes department in the Grand Est region of northern France.

The inhabitants of the commune are known as Baâlonnais or Baâlonnaises.

Geography
Baâlons is located some 25 km north-east of Rethel and 18 km south of Charleville-Mézières. Access to the commune is by the D28 road from Bouvellemont in the south which passes through the village and continues north-east then north to join the D27.  The D991 also goes north from Bouvellemont passing through the west of the commune to join the D951 north of Mazerny. The commune is mixed forest and farmland with particularly large forests in the east.

The Ruisseau du Fond Cahors rises west of the village and flows west to join the Ruisseau de la Fontaine aux Chênes. The Ruisseau des Puiselets forms the western border of the commune as it flows south to join the Ruisseau du Fond Cahors. The Ruisseau de Baâlons rises in the north of the commune and flows south towards the village then turns east to join the Ruisseau de Bairon on the eastern border. The Ruisseau de Bairon forms the eastern border of the commune as it flows south to join the Étang de Bairon which feeds into the Canal des Ardennes west of Tannay.

Hamlets and localities in the commune

Géraumont
Géraumont was a former fief where there is still a castle, now Géromont Farm.

Les Puiselets
A small hamlet west of Baâlons village. It is now very sparsely populated however the General Dictionary of cities towns, villages, hamlets and farms of France by Duclos says that in 1846 there were 70 inhabitants.

Beauvois
A Hamlet in the north of the commune which is still populated.

Neighbouring communes and villages

History
Various objects have been found in the commune:
Tools and shards of flint which are probably Neolithic
Gallo-Roman Bronze Statuettes of Mars and Jupiter
A Merovingian and Carolingian Cemetery

The Universal Dictionary of Ancient and Modern France and New France by Marin Saugrain stated in 1726 that:

"BAALON in Champagne, Diocese of Reims, Parliament of Paris, Intendance of Chalons, Election of Rhetel, has 419 inhabitants. The Curate is worth nine hundred livres.".

Heraldry

Administration

List of Successive Mayors

Population

Sites and Monuments

The Church of Saint-Rémi is a church dating to the 13th century in the late Romanesque style with a tympanum over the door from the 10th century representing a man with a crosier and an open book flanked by two angels. The church contains two items which are registered as historical objects:
A Group Sculpture: Saint Nicolas (17th century)
A Statue: Virgin and child (14th century)
The Chapel of Saint Anne was built in 1911 on the site of a chapel dating from 1807 near the Saint Anne spring which was a place of pilgrimage. The Procession of Saint Anne is held on 26 July of each year.

Church and Chapel Picture Gallery

Notable people linked to the commune
Eugène Houssière, emigrated to Louisiana USA in 1883, donated the Chapel of Saint Anne in 1911.

See also
Communes of the Ardennes department

References

External links
 Baâlons
 Baâlons on the old National Geographic Institute website
Baâlons on Géoportail, National Geographic Institute (IGN) website 
Baalon on the 1750 Cassini Map

Communes of Ardennes (department)